The 1994–95 season of the EHF Cup was won by BM Granollers.

Preliminary round

First round

Eighth-finals

Quarter-finals

Semi-finals

Final

See also
 European Handball Federation

References
 

EHF Cup seasons
Ehf Cup, 1994/95
Ehf Cup, 1994/95